Thomas Bird may refer to:
 Thomas Bird (sportsman) (1904–1979), Australian sportsman; cricketer for Victoria and Australian rules footballer with Collingwood
 Thomas Bird (fur trader) (died 1739), trader and factor for the Hudson's Bay Company
 Thomas William Bird (1883–1958), Canadian clergyman and politician
 Thomas Bird (bishop), 15th-century bishop of St Asaph
 Thomas A. Bird (1918–2017), British soldier and architect

See also
 Thomas Bird Mosher (1852–1923), American publisher